Gloria Gauchia (born 4 September 1972) is a Spanish table tennis player. She competed in the women's doubles event at the 1992 Summer Olympics.

References

External links
 

1972 births
Living people
Spanish female table tennis players
Olympic table tennis players of Spain
Table tennis players at the 1992 Summer Olympics
Sportspeople from Girona